Dayrit is a surname. Notable people with the surname include:

Amando G. Dayrit (1912–1944), Filipino journalist
Conrado Dayrit (1919–2007), Filipino scientist
Fabian Dayrit, Filipino chemist
Francisco Dayrit Sr. (1907–1983), Filipino fencer
Nicolasa Dayrit Panlilio (1874–1945)